Tseajaia is an extinct genus of tetrapod. It was a basal diadectomorph that lived in the Permian of North America. The skeleton is that of a medium-sized, rather advanced reptile-like amphibian. The dentition was somewhat blunt, indicating herbivory or possibly omnivory.

Classification
Tseajaia was described from a single, fairly complete specimen and was given its own family by Robert L. Carroll. It was originally thought to be a Seymouriamorph. Additional finds allowing for a better taxonomic analysis indicate they belong in the Diadectomorpha, as the sister group to the large and more derived Diadectidae. Tseajaia itself being a fairly generalized form, gives a reasonable indication of the build and looks of the closest relatives of the amniotes.

References

External links
Tseajaia in the Paleobiology Database

Diadectomorphs
Permian tetrapods of North America
Transitional fossils